Legislative Assembly elections are speculated be held in the union territory of Jammu and Kashmir, India in 2023 to elect 90 members of Jammu and Kashmir Legislative Assembly. The legislative assembly has been dissolved since November 2018.

The next elections would be the first since 2014 and the first since the territory's special status was revoked and its statehood withdrawn in 2019.

Background
The previous assembly elections were held in November–December 2014. After the election, coalition of Jammu and Kashmir Peoples Democratic Party and Bharatiya Janata Party formed the state government, with Mufti Mohammad Sayeed becoming the Chief Minister.

Chief Minister Mufti Mohammad Sayeed died on 7 January 2016. After a brief period of Governor's rule, Mehbooba Mufti was sworn in as the next Chief Minister of Jammu and Kashmir.

Political developments

Dissolution of assembly and President's rule 
In June 2018, BJP withdrew its support from the government and Governor's rule was subsequently imposed in Jammu and Kashmir. In November 2018, the state assembly was dissolved by Governor of Jammu and Kashmir Satya Pal Malik. President's rule was imposed on 20 December 2018.

Revocation of Article 370 and reorganisation of state 
In 2019, Article 370 of the Constitution of India, which gave special status to Jammu and Kashmir, was abrogated and the Jammu and Kashmir Reorganisation Act was passed to reconstitute the state of Jammu and Kashmir into union territories of Jammu and Kashmir and Ladakh with effect from 31 October 2019.

Delimitation 
In March 2020, a three-member Delimitation Commission was formed, chaired by retired Justice Ranjana Prakash Desai, for the delimitation of the union territory of Jammu and Kashmir. The commission published its interim report in February 2022. The final delimitation report was released on 5 May 2022 under which additional 6 seats were added to Jammu division and 1 seat to Kashmir division. After delimitation, the total seats in the assembly rose to 114 seats, out of which 24 seats are designated for areas that fall under Pakistani Administered Kashmir. Out of the remaining 90 seats, 43 seats are in Jammu division and 47 seats are in the Kashmir division. The final delimitation report came into force from 20 May 2022.

DDC elections 
In 2020, DDC elections were held after revocation of special status. BJP emerged as single largest party and PAGD emerged as victorious. BJP had won 3 seats in Kashmir Valley for the first time in history.

Democratic Azad Party     
Former Chief Minister Ghulam Nabi Azad resigned from Indian National Congress on 26 August 2022 and launched a new party named Democratic Azad Party on 26 September 2022.

Parties and alliances







Others

See also
 2023 elections in India
 Elections in Jammu and Kashmir
 Politics of Jammu and Kashmir

Notes

References

State Assembly elections in Jammu and Kashmir
2020s in Jammu and Kashmir